Tazeh Kand-e Afshar (also Romanized as Tāzeh Kand-e Afshār; also known as Tāzehkand-e Gardābād) is a village in Nazluy-ye Jonubi Rural District, in the Central District of Urmia County, West Azerbaijan Province, Iran. At the 2006 census, its population was 304, in 88 families.

References 

Populated places in Urmia County